Floyd County is a county located in the U.S. state of Indiana. Its county seat is New Albany. Floyd County has the second-smallest land area in the entire state. It was formed in the year 1819 from neighboring Clark, and Harrison counties.

Floyd County is part of the Louisville/Jefferson County, KY–IN Metropolitan Statistical Area.

History

Floyd County, originally the Shawnee Indians hunting ground, was conquered for the United States by George Rogers Clark during the American Revolutionary War from the British. He was awarded large tracts of land in Indiana, including almost all of present-day Floyd County. Clark sold land to the settlers who began arriving as soon as peace returned.

In 1818, New Albany was large enough to become a county seat and form a new county. New Albany leaders sent Nathaniel Scribner and John K. Graham to the capital at Corydon to petition the General Assembly. Legislation was passed on January 2, 1819, by the General Assembly, and the county was established on February 1. The origin of the county's name is debated. According to the State Library, it was named for John Floyd, a leading Jefferson County, Kentucky pioneer and uncle of Davis Floyd. John Floyd was killed in 1783 when his party was attacked by Indians in Bullitt County, Kentucky. However, some maintain the county was actually named for Davis Floyd, who was convicted of aiding Aaron Burr in the treason of 1809. Davis Floyd had also been a leading local political figure and was the county's first circuit court judge.

In 1814, New Albany was platted and was established as the county seat on March 4, 1819. There was an attempt in 1823 to move the county seat, but the motion failed. New Albany would be the largest city in the state for much of the early 19th century, eventually being overtaken by Indianapolis during the Civil War.

Between 1800 and 1860, Floyd County experienced a huge boom in population (doubling many times over). A survey in the 1850s found that over half of Indiana's population that made more than $100,000 per year lived in Floyd County, establishing it as having the richest population in the state.

The Duncan Tunnel, the longest tunnel in Indiana, was built in Floyd County in 1881 between New Albany and Edwardsville. Because no route over the Floyds Knobs was suitable for a railroad line, civil engineers decided to tunnel through them. The project was originally started by the Air Line but was completed by Southern Railway. It took five years to bore at a cost of $1 million.

Floyd County, during the 19th century, attracted immigrants of Irish, German, French and African American origins. The French settlers located mostly in Floyds Knobs, Indiana. The Irish began arriving in 1817 and settled in large numbers between 1830 and 1850. German immigrants settled mostly in New Albany. By 1850, about one in six county residents had been born in other countries. Mount Saint Francis, a multi-purpose complex owned and administered by the Conventual Franciscan Friars of the Province of Our Lady of Consolation, is located in Floyds Knobs along Highway 150. The property includes 400 acres of woods and Mount Saint Francis Lake, both which are open to the public. Numerous hiking trails meander through the woods and fields containing native prairie grasses. No hunting is allowed on the property.

Geography

It is the second smallest county in area, behind only Ohio County, although significantly more populated.

City
 New Albany

Towns
 Georgetown
 Greenville

Census-designated place
 Galena

Townships
Floyd County is divided into five townships:
 Franklin
 Georgetown
 Greenville
 Lafayette
 New Albany

Geographical features
The Knobs Unit, which includes Floyd County, contains some of the hilliest country in Indiana. As a result, the area supports trees that prefer very dry sites and ridgetops, as well as those that prefer very wet sites, ravines, or “bottomland.” Tree types unique to the unit include blackjack oak and swamp tupelo. Part of the unit stands on sandstone bedrock; other areas developed over limestone. This difference accommodates a variety of trees and their associated flowering plants and shrubs. Trees found in Floyd County include the Sycamore, Flowering Dogwood, Virginia Pine, Easter Redcedar, American Beech, Sugar Maple, American Elm and Chestnut Oak.

Major highways
 Interstate 64
 Interstate 265
 U.S. Route 150
 Indiana State Road 11
 Indiana State Road 62
 Indiana State Road 64
 Indiana State Road 111
 Indiana State Road 335

Adjacent counties
 Clark County  (northeast)
 Jefferson County, Kentucky  (south, across the Ohio River)
 Harrison County (west)
 Washington County (northwest)

Climate and weather

On July 4, 2012, the record for highest temperature in the county was almost broken; the temperature reached 106 °F (41 °C).

Government

The county government is a constitutional body, and is granted specific powers by the Constitution of Indiana and the Indiana Code.

County Council: The county council is the legislative branch of the county government and controls all the spending and revenue collection in the county. Floyd county is divided into 44 precincts which are organized into four districts, each district elects one representative to the council. Three other members are elected to the county at large. The council members serve four-year terms. They are responsible for setting salaries, the annual budget, and special spending. The council also has limited authority to impose local taxes, in the form of an income and property tax that is subject to state level approval, excise taxes, and service taxes.

Board of Commissioners: The executive body of the county is made of a board of commissioners. The commissioners are elected county-wide, in staggered terms, and each serves a four-year term. One of the commissioners, typically the most senior, serves as president. The commissioners are charged with executing the acts legislated by the council, collecting revenue, and managing the day-to-day functions of the county government.

Court: Floyd County's court system consists of a Circuit Court, three Superior Courts and a Magistrate Court. 

County Officials: The county has several other elected offices, including sheriff, coroner, auditor, treasurer, recorder, surveyor, and circuit court clerk. Each of these elected officers serves a term of four years and oversees a different part of county government. Members elected to county government positions are required to declare party affiliations and to be residents of the county.

Floyd County has nine public parks within the county, the largest being the 104-acre Sam Peden Community Park in New Albany.

Floyd County is part of Indiana's 9th congressional district and is represented in Congress by Republican Trey Hollingsworth It is also part of Indiana Senate district 46 and Indiana House of Representatives districts 70 and 72.

Demographics

As of the 2010 United States Census, there were 74,578 people, 29,479 households, and 20,264 families residing in the county. The racial makeup of the county was 90.4% white, 5.2% black or African American, 0.9% Asian, 0.2% American Indian, 1.2% from other races, and 2.1% from two or more races. Those of Hispanic or Latino origin made up 2.6% of the population. In terms of ancestry, 29.4% were German, 15.0% were Irish, 11.0% were English, and 10.6% were American.

Of the 29,479 households, 33.5% had children under the age of 18 living with them, 50.4% were married couples living together, 13.6% had a female householder with no husband present, 31.3% were non-families, and 25.6% of all households were made up of individuals. The average household size was 2.48 and the average family size was 2.98. The median age was 39.1 years.

The median income for a household in the county was $47,697 and the median income for a family was $63,139. Males had a median income of $45,699 versus $33,749 for females. The per capita income for the county was $25,971. About 8.2% of families and 10.8% of the population were below the poverty line, including 16.6% of those under age 18 and 7.7% of those age 65 or over.

2020 census

Education
New Albany-Floyd County Consolidated School Corporation serves the county. New Albany High School was the first public high school in the state, opening its doors in 1853. The school system has two high schools, New Albany High School and Floyd Central High School, nine elementary schools and three middle schools. The district's enrollment totals approximately 12,000 students in pre-kindergarten through high school programs. The district employs more than 1,200 full-time personnel, which includes approximately 750 teachers, and 375 part-time personnel, according to the 2017 NA-FC website.

All Floyd County residents are eligible to obtain a library card at the New Albany-Floyd County Public Library in New Albany.

Gallery

See also
 Indiana University Southeast
 List of public art in Floyd County, Indiana
 Louisville-Jefferson County, KY-IN Metropolitan Statistical Area
 Louisville/Jefferson County–Elizabethtown–Bardstown, KY-IN Combined Statistical Area
 National Register of Historic Places listings in Floyd County, Indiana

External links
 County website
 Clark-Floyd counties tourism bureau

References

 
Indiana counties
1819 establishments in Indiana
Populated places established in 1819
Indiana counties on the Ohio River
Louisville metropolitan area